The 1949–50 season was the 57th season in Liverpool F.C.'s existence, and ended with the club finishing eighth in the table. Liverpool had played the first 19 games of the season unbeaten up to the middle of December and despite losing games after this, still remained top of the league on Good Friday. On Easter Sunday, Liverpool lost 5–1 away to Newcastle and went on to lose three of their last four games, ultimately finishing the season in eighth place, five points off ultimate league winners Portsmouth.

They also reached the FA Cup Final but lost 2-0 to Arsenal.

Squad

Goalkeepers
 Charlie Ashcroft
 Ray Minshull
 Cyril Sidlow

Defenders
 Joe Cadden
 Frank Christie
 John Heydon
 Laurie Hughes
 Bill Jones
 Ray Lambert
 Bob Paisley
 Bill Shepherd
 Sam Shields
 Eddie Spicer
 Phil Taylor

Midfielders
 Ken Brierley
 Billy Liddell
 Tommy McLeod
 Jimmy Payne
 Bryan Williams

Forwards
 Jack Balmer
 Kevin Baron
 Cyril Done
 Willie Fagan
 Albert Stubbins

Table

Results

First Division

FA Cup

Final

References
Citations

Sources

External links
 LFC History.net – 1949–50 season
 Liverweb - 1949–50 Season

Liverpool F.C. seasons
Liverpool